Angola competed at the 2007 World Championships in Athletics with 2 athletes.

Competitors 

Nations at the 2007 World Championships in Athletics
World Championships in Athletics
Angola at the World Championships in Athletics